John C. Kimmel (born June 25, 1954, in East Orange, New Jersey) is an American thoroughbred racehorse trainer.  He holds a pre-med undergraduate degree from the University of Colorado at Boulder and he graduated from the University of Pennsylvania Veterinary School in 1980.

References
John Kimmel Biography at Breeders' Cup.com
 John Kimmel at the NTRA

1954 births
Living people
American veterinarians
Male veterinarians
American horse trainers
University of Colorado Boulder alumni
University of Pennsylvania School of Veterinary Medicine alumni
Sportspeople from East Orange, New Jersey